KMJC-LD, virtual channel 25 (UHF digital channel 22), is a low-powered Buzzr-affiliated television station licensed to Louisburg, Kansas, United States. The station is owned by Heartland Broadcasting, LLC.

KCKS-LD in Kansas City, Kansas simulcasts its programming and commercials on two sister stations WROB-LD in Topeka and KMJC-LD.

Digital Television

Digital channels

The station's digital signal is multiplexed:

References

External links
 

Television stations in Kansas
Buzzr affiliates
True Crime Network affiliates
WeatherNation TV affiliates
Retro TV affiliates
Television channels and stations established in 2014
Low-power television stations in the United States
2014 establishments in Kansas